Sky is the name of multiple magazines.

It may refer to:

 SKY Magazine (1987-2001; aka "SKY"), British pop cultural magazine, published fortnightly by News International and then monthly by EMAP
 Sky Magazine (ceased 2011; aka "Sky Mag"), British pop culture magazine for Sky Digital subscribers published by BSkyB
 Sky Kids (magazine) (2004-2009), a children's edition of the BSkyB magazine
 Skymag Ireland, the Irish edition of the BSkyB magazine
 The Sky (magazine) (1935-1941), U.S. astronomy magazine, predecessor to Sky and Telescope
 Delta Sky Magazine, Delta Air Lines inflight magazine published by MSP Communications

It may also refer to:

 Sky & Telescope (since 1941), U.S. astronomy magazine founded as a merger between The Sky and The Telescope and The Amateur Astronomer
 BBC Sky at Night (since 2005), British astronomy magazine, complement to the TV programme The Sky At Night

See also
 Sky (disambiguation)